The discography of American rapper and producer JPEGMafia consists of four studio albums, two extended plays, eight mixtapes, two video albums and 27 singles (including seven as a featured artist).

JPEGMafia began his music career under the stage name Devon Hendryx, releasing eight mixtapes in total, as well as two video albums.

He released his debut studio album Black Ben Carson in February 2016. A few months later, he released a collaborative album titled The 2nd Amendment with fellow rapper Freaky. His second solo studio album Veteran was released in January 2018 to widespread critical acclaim. In September 2019, he released his third studio album All My Heroes Are Cornballs, to further acclaim. It debuted at number 105 on the Billboard 200, becoming his first entry on the chart.

Albums

Studio albums

Collaborative projects

Mixtapes

Compilations

Visual albums

Extended plays

Singles

As lead artist

As featured artist

Guest appearances

Music videos

As lead artist

As featured artist

Production credits

References 

Discographies of American artists
Hip hop discographies